Gordon "Gord" Krantz is the mayor of Milton, Ontario, in Canada. He was elected mayor in the Municipal Elections of 1980, after serving as town councillor from 1965 to 1980. He has been re-elected for a total of 21 terms (7 as councillor and 14 as mayor). With his re-election in 2014, Krantz surpassed the retired Hazel McCallion as Ontario's longest-serving mayor on December 1, 2016, and the longest-serving mayor of major municipality in Canada. He was re-elected by a wide margin in the October 22, 2018 municipal election.

Early life 
Krantz owned and operated his own business Krantz Fuels (1961–1980), and served the Town of Milton as part-time firefighter (1960–1980). He was also on the Prosperity One Credit Union Board of Directors since 1971, and has held membership with the Royal Canadian Legion since 1963.

Political career
As a politician, he has served the Town of Milton since first being elected as a councillor in 1965. At the time he ran for the November 10 1980 mayoral elections, he was the Ward Two councillor, and had served five years as vice-chairman of the Halton Region Conservation Authority, plus seven years as the vice-president of the Halton Community Credit Union.

Mayor Krantz has also been a contributor to the Region of Halton's growth plan by serving on the Regional Municipality of Halton Council since 1980, Conservation Halton Board of Directors since 1973, Niagara Escarpment Commission for three terms and various Ad-Hoc and Standing Committees.  He is a founding member and strong supporter of the Greater Toronto Marketing Alliance.

Major projects during his time as mayor include the restoration of the Town Hall facility, the Milton Leisure Centre, the 401 Industrial Park, the Mill Pond restoration, Rotary Park redevelopment, Hawthorne Village, Milton Centre for the Arts, the Milton Sports Centre, the Mattamy National Cycling Centre, the Milton Education Village, smart traffic system implementation and the Sherwood Community Centre and Library.

While Krantz believes that Halton Region will adopt a mandatory COVID mask by-law, he voted against Milton taking such action at the town level.

Personal life
Krantz grew up in Milton Heights alongside four sisters and two brothers. He met his wife, Olive, during his teenage years and they married in 1958. They have two children, six grandchildren, and eight great grandchildren.

Election results

References

External links
  Town of Milton official website
 Town of Milton Official Council and Mayor's Page

Living people
People from Milton, Ontario
1937 births
Mayors of places in Ontario